Accel Animation Studios is an Indian animation studio that provides 2D, 3D animation, visual effects and gaming services to companies in India and overseas. It is a division of Chennai-based technology services company, Accel Transmatic Limited and was formed in 2006.

History
Accel Animation Studios was founded in 2006 in Chennai. It is a part of Accel Transmatic Limited and has facilities spanning across Chennai and Thiruvananthapuram. The company has over 80 animators working in its offices in Thiruvananthapuram.
In 2013, Accel Animation set up its subsidiary in Kerala called Mocap Studio.

Locations 

Accel Animation Studios has production facilities at two locations in India - Chennai and Trivandram. As of 2011, both the facilities enjoy promotional duty and tax exemptions as animation industry is considered a new venture by the government of India. The infrastructure includes a Windows-based computer cluster, quad-core workstations and high-speed connectivity using Cisco Catalyst 4500 'E' series switch. It also includes a 32 Camera Motion Capture System, on site audio recording and editing suite.

Outside India, the company has operations in California, United States.

See also

 Technicolor India

References

External links
 

2006 establishments in Tamil Nadu
Mass media companies established in 2006
Indian animation studios
Film production companies based in Chennai